4th NSFC Awards
January 5, 1970

Best Film: 
 Z 
The 4th National Society of Film Critics Awards, given on 5 January 1970, honored the best filmmaking of 1969.

The member critics voting for the awards were Hollis Alpert of the Saturday Review, Harold Clurman of The Nation, Jay Cocks of Time, Brad Darrach of Movie, Penelope Gilliatt of The New Yorker, Pauline Kael of The New Yorker, Stefan Kanfer of Time, Stanley Kauffmann of The New Republic, Robert Kotlowitz of Harper's Magazine, Joseph Morgenstern of Newsweek, Andrew Sarris of The Village Voice, Richard Schickel of Life, Arthur M. Schlesinger, Jr. of Vogue, and John Simon of The New Leader.

Winners

Best Picture 
Z (21 points)

2. Stolen Kisses (11 points) 
3. The Unfaithful Wife (10 points)

Best Director 
François Truffaut – Stolen Kisses (12 points)

2. Costa-Gavras – Z (11 points) 
3. Claude Chabrol – The Unfaithful Wife (9 points) 
3. Miklós Jancsó – The Red and the White (9 points)

Best Actor 
Jon Voight – Midnight Cowboy (18 points)

2. Peter O'Toole – Goodbye, Mr. Chips (14 points) 
3. Michel Bouquet – The Unfaithful Wife (9 points) 
3. Robert Redford – Downhill Racer and Butch Cassidy and the Sundance Kid (9 points)

Best Actress 
Vanessa Redgrave – The Loves of Isadora (24 points)

2. Jane Fonda – They Shoot Horses, Don't They? (16 points) 
3. Verna Bloom – Medium Cool (5 points) 
3. Maggie Smith – The Prime of Miss Jean Brodie (5 points) 
3. Ingrid Thulin – The Damned (5 points)

Best Supporting Actor 
Jack Nicholson – Easy Rider (majority vote – 1st ballot)

Best Supporting Actress (tie) 
Delphine Seyrig – Stolen Kisses (13 points)
Siân Phillips – Goodbye, Mr. Chips (13 points)

3. Verna Bloom – Medium Cool (12 points) 
3. Dyan Cannon – Bob & Carol & Ted & Alice (12 points) 
3. Celia Johnson – The Prime of Miss Jean Brodie

Best Screenplay 
Paul Mazursky and Larry Tucker – Bob & Carol & Ted & Alice (22 points)

2. Costa-Gavras and Jorge Semprún – Z (18 points) 
3. Alvin Sargent – The Sterile Cuckoo (6 points)

Best Cinematography 
Lucien Ballard – The Wild Bunch (16 points)

2. Miroslav Ondricek – If.... (11 points) 
3. Haskell Wexler – Medium Cool (8 points)

Special Awards 
Ivan Passer for Intimate Lighting, "a first film of great originality."
Dennis Hopper "for his achievements in Easy Rider as director, co-writer and co-star."

References

External links
Past Awards

1969
National Society of Film Critics Awards
National Society of Film Critics Awards
National Society of Film Critics Awards